In mathematics, a bilinear map is a function combining elements of two vector spaces to yield an element of a third vector space, and is linear in each of its arguments. Matrix multiplication is an example.

Definition

Vector spaces 
Let  and  be three vector spaces over the same base field . A bilinear map is a function

such that for all , the map 

Such a map  satisfies the following properties.

 For any , 
 The map  is additive in both components: if  and  then  and 

If  and we have  for all  then we say that B is symmetric.  If X is the base field F, then the map is called a bilinear form, which are well-studied (for example: scalar product, inner product, and quadratic form).

Modules 
The definition works without any changes if instead of vector spaces over a field F, we use modules over a commutative ring R. It generalizes to n-ary functions, where the proper term is multilinear.

For non-commutative rings R and S, a left R-module M and a right S-module N, a bilinear map is a map  with T an -bimodule, and for which any n in N,  is an R-module homomorphism, and for any m in M,  is an S-module homomorphism.  This satisfies

B(r ⋅ m, n) = r ⋅ B(m, n)
B(m, n ⋅ s) = B(m, n) ⋅ s

for all m in M, n in N, r in R and s in S, as well as B being additive in each argument.

Properties

The set  of all bilinear maps is a linear subspace of the space (viz. vector space, module) of all maps from  into X.

To see this, choose a basis for V and W; then each bilinear map can be uniquely represented by the matrix , and vice versa. 
Now, if X is a space of higher dimension, we obviously have .

Examples 
 Matrix multiplication is a bilinear map .
 If a vector space V over the real numbers  carries an inner product, then the inner product is a bilinear map   The product vector space has one dimension.
 In general, for a vector space V over a field F, a bilinear form on V is the same as a bilinear map .
 Let V and W be vector spaces over the same base field F. If f is a member of V∗ and g a member of W∗, then  defines a bilinear map .

Continuity and separate continuity 

Suppose  are topological vector spaces and let  be a bilinear map. 
Then b is said to be  if the following two conditions hold:

Many separately continuous bilinear that are not continuous satisfy an additional property: hypocontinuity. 
All continuous bilinear maps are hypocontinuous.

Sufficient conditions for continuity 

Many bilinear maps that occur in practice are separately continuous but not all are continuous. 
We list here sufficient conditions for a separately continuous bilinear to be continuous.

 If X is a Baire space and Y is metrizable then every separately continuous bilinear map  is continuous. 
 If  are the strong duals of Fréchet spaces then every separately continuous bilinear map  is continuous.
 If a bilinear map is continuous at (0, 0) then it is continuous everywhere.

Composition map 

Let  be locally convex Hausdorff spaces and let  be the composition map defined by  
In general, the bilinear map  is not continuous (no matter what topologies the spaces of linear maps are given). 
We do, however, have the following results:

Give all three spaces of linear maps one of the following topologies:
 give all three the topology of bounded convergence; 
 give all three the topology of compact convergence; 
 give all three the topology of pointwise convergence.

 If  is an equicontinuous subset of  then the restriction  is continuous for all three topologies.

See also

References

Bibliography

External links
 

Bilinear maps
Multilinear algebra